№1 (pronounced "number one") is the debut studio album by Serbian recording artist Nikolija. It was released on October 20, 2016 by City Records. Nikolija teased the album's release on October 13, two weeks after giving birth to her first daughter. No1 includes seven singles from the beginnings of her career and three new songs: "101 propušteni poziv", "Plavo more" and "Pucaj zbog nas". Musically, the record is overall electropop oriented with strong pop-folk and urban contemporary music influences. No1 was sold in 50,000 units in Serbia, while also exceeding 200 million of combined views on YouTube as of October 2021.

Track listing
Credits adapted from Discogs.

Personnel
Credits adapted from the album's liner notes

Performers and musicians

Nikolija – vocals
Elitni Odredi – rap 
Techa – rap 
Marko Peruničić - backing vocals 
Damir Handanović – backing vocals 
Suzana Branković – backing vocals 
Relja Popović – backing vocals 
Ksenija Milanković - backing vocals 
Lejla Hot – backing vocals 
Ivana Peters - backing vocals 
Eljez Šabani – clarinet and saxophone 
Petar Trumbetaš – guitar 
Senad Bislimi and Ivan Obradović - keyboards 
Dimitrios Gaidztsis - keyboards 
DJ Mlađa - keyboards 
Marko Peruničić and Nebojša Arežina - percussion instruments, keyboards 
P. Manov – el. guitar and bouzouki 
Alen Stajić - piano and keyboards 

Design and management

Marko Vulević – photography
Stanislav Zakić - graphic design
Srđan Petković – hair and makeup
Stefan Orlić – Styling

Release history

References

Nikolija albums
City Records albums
2016 debut albums